Presidential and vice presidential elections, legislative elections and local elections were held in the Philippines on May 11, 1992. An estimated 80,000 candidates ran for 17,000 posts from the presidency down to municipal councillors in the first general election under the 1987 Constitution. Even though she was permitted by the Constitution to run for a second term, President Corazon Aquino did not stand for re-election.

Retired general Fidel Ramos of Lakas-NUCD won a six-year term as president of the Philippines by a small margin, narrowly defeating populist candidate Miriam Defensor Santiago of the People's Reform Party. Ramos also got the lowest plurality in Philippine electoral history. Santiago led the canvassing of votes for the first five days, but was overtaken by Ramos afterwards. Santiago accused Ramos of fraud and filed an electoral protest citing power outages as evidence, but her protest was eventually dismissed.

The 1992 election was the second time both the president and vice-president came from different parties. Film actor and senator Joseph Estrada won a six-year term as Ramos' vice-president by a landslide victory.

Under the transitory provisions of the Constitution, 24 senators were elected in the polls. The first twelve senators who garnered the highest votes would have a six-year term while the next twelve senators would have a three-year term. Laban ng Demokratikong Pilipino (LDP) got a large share in the Senate race. Television personality and Quezon City Vice-Mayor Vicente Sotto III got the highest number of votes.

Major political parties 
 Kilusang Bagong Lipunan (KBL)
 Lakas ng Tao—National Union of Christian Democrats (Lakas–NUCD)
 Laban ng Demokratikong Pilipino (LDP)
 Liberal Party—Partido Demokratiko Pilipino–Lakas ng Bayan (LP—PDP–Laban; Koalisyong Pambansa)
 Nacionalista Party (NP)
 Nationalist People's Coalition (NPC)
 People's Reform Party (PRP)

Results

President

Vice president

Senate
The top 12 elected candidates served from June 30, 1992, until June 30, 1998, while the following 12 elected candidates were to serve from June 30, 1992, until June 30, 1995. A total of 166 candidates ran for senator.

House of Representatives

See also
Commission on Elections
Politics of the Philippines
Philippine elections
President of the Philippines
9th Congress of the Philippines

References

External links
 Official website of the Commission on Elections

Further reading
 

1992
General election